Acorn is an unincorporated community in Santa Barbara County, in the U.S. state of California.

References

Unincorporated communities in Santa Barbara County, California
Unincorporated communities in California